The Femlin is a character used on the Party Jokes page of Playboy magazine. Created in 1955 by LeRoy Neiman, Femlins became a mainstay of the magazine for more than five decades.

Some Femlin figurines produced in the 1960s have become much sought-after by collectors.

History 
Femlins were created by sport illustrator LeRoy Neiman in 1955 when publisher/editor Hugh Hefner decided the Party Jokes page needed a visual element. The name is a portmanteau of "female" and "gremlin." They are usually drawn in two or three panel vignettes, interacting with various life-sized items such as shoes, jewelry, neckties and such.

Femlins have appeared on the Party Jokes page in every issue since their creation, and were featured on the magazine's cover numerous times, either as drawn by Neiman or in photographed tableaus of sculpted clay models. Neiman reportedly submitted two drawings of Femlin to Playboy every month for more than 50 years, working on the character late into his life, before his death at the age of 91 in 2012.

Merchandising 

Femlins have been featured on a variety of merchandise throughout the years, such as ashtrays, shotglasses, and coffee mugs.  A set of four plaster statues, the tallest approximately 14" high, was advertised for sale in the back pages of Playboy in 1963. (Like the drawings on which they were based, these statues were not anatomically detailed.) Originally priced at US$7.50 apiece in 1963, a complete set of the four statuettes was auctioned off by Leland's auction house in June 2004 for US$7,904.80, according to a Google cache of the auction.

In 2004, Playboy produced a new, updated figurine of a Femlin sitting in a champagne glass.  Though now out of production, these are extremely common, and should not be confused with the older figurines.

External links

References

1955 comics debuts
Collecting
Comics characters introduced in 1955
Mascots introduced in 1955
Erotic comics
Female characters in comics
Female characters in advertising
Gag cartoon comics
Magazine mascots
Playboy characters
Gremlins
Fictional fairies and sprites